Warren Township is one of eleven townships in Camden County, Missouri, USA.  As of the 2000 census, its population was 2,466.

Warren Township Township was established in 1841, and most likely named after Joseph Warren.

Geography
It contains seven cemeteries: Baker, Claiborne, Dickerson, Garrison, Lodge, Stone and Webster.

Trout Glen Pool is within this township. The streams of Arnold Branch, Bank Branch, Forbes Branch, Niangua River, Spencer Creek and Weaver Creek run through this township.

Transportation
Warren Township contains one airport or landing strip, Camdenton Memorial Airport.

References

 USGS Geographic Names Information System (GNIS)

External links
 US-Counties.com
 City-Data.com

Townships in Camden County, Missouri
Townships in Missouri